Robert Michael Neuman is a professor of art history at Florida State University, where he specializes in early modern European art, with an emphasis on social and religious history, gender studies, and the intersection of high art and popular culture.  His scholarship encompasses all media - painting, sculpture, architecture, prints, decorative arts, and costume.

His 1994 book, Robert de Cotte and the Perfection of Architecture in Eighteenth-Century France, is the first comprehensive examination of the French royal architect, Robert de Cotte, during a period when Paris became the center of courtly fashion.  He also regularly serves on doctoral dissertation committees.

Biography 
Neuman holds a PhD from the University of Michigan and was formerly a book review editor for the Journal of the Society of Architectural Historians (JSAH).  He was the 1986-87 recipient of the Florida State University Teaching Award, the 1994 Millard Meiss Publication Fund, as well as various other teaching awards.

Current projects 
He is currently working as principal investigator for a project with the Florida Center for Advising & Academic Support (FCAAS) as well as researching the role of American movies in shaping perceptions of historic architecture.

Selected publications 
"Illusions of Grandeur: A Harmonious Garden for the Sun King." In Gardening Philosophy for Everyone: Cultivating Wisdom, edited by Dan O'Brien, 163-77. Oxford: Wiley Blackwell, 2010.
"Main Street, USA." In Disneyland and Culture: Essays on the Parks and Their Influence, edited by Kathy Merlock Jackson and Mark I. West. Jefferson, NC: McFarland, 2010.
"Disneyland's Main Street, U.S.A., and Its Sources in Hollywood, U.S.A." Journal of American Culture 31 (2008); 83-97.
"Now Mickey Mouse Enters Art's Temple: Walt Disney at the Intersection of Art and Entertainment." Visual Resources 14.3 (1999): 249-61.
Biographical entries, Oxford Art Online (Dictionary of Art., Ed. Jane Turner. 36 vols. New York: Grove: 1996).
Robert de Cotte and the Perfection of Architecture in Eighteenth-Century France. Chicago: University of Chicago Press, 1994.
"Projects for the Church of Saint-Louis de Versailles in the Parc-aux-Cerfs." Eighteenth-Century Life 17 (1993): 182-93.
"Watteau's L'enseigne de Gersaint and Baroque Emblematic Tradition." Gazette des Beaux-Arts 104 (1984): 153-64.

References 
Faculty webpage page at Florida State University

Society of Architectural Historians

Florida Center for Advising & Academic Support (FCAAS)

Florida State University faculty
American art historians
University of Michigan alumni
American non-fiction writers
Year of birth missing (living people)
Living people